Baird Brothers Fine Hardwoods is a privately held manufacturer and retailer of interior hardwood products. It has been family owned and operated since 1960. The company is headquartered in Canfield, Ohio.

Baird Brothers manufactures and retails interior hardwood products. The company produces products as simple as dimensional lumber and hardwood flooring, to custom doors, mouldings, and other products.

History 
Baird Brothers Fine Hardwoods, also known by its incorporated name, Baird Brothers Sawmill, was founded in 1960.

President Paul Baird, the last surviving founder, but the company still remains a family owned and operated business. Now into their second generation, the family business is conducted by Scott Baird, Mark Baird, Matt Baird, Lori Baird, Terry Baird, and Tim Baird.

Currently the company operates all of its business through its headquarters in Canfield, Ohio, doing most of its business through online and phone sales. Baird Brothers has an annual festival named the "Red White & True Fall Festival". The company has evolved from a small operation to a nationwide corporation housing their finished product in warehouses spanning more than 200 yards.

References

Companies based in Ohio
Manufacturing companies established in 1960
Timber industry
Retail companies established in 1960
1960 establishments in Ohio